Bracken Kearns (born May 12, 1981) is a Canadian former professional ice hockey player. Along with an extensive minor league career, he played for the Florida Panthers, San Jose Sharks and New York Islanders of the National Hockey League (NHL).

Playing career

Amateur
Kearns, who graduated from the University of Calgary in 2005 with a degree in economics, was captain of the Calgary Dinos men's ice hockey team.

Professional
Kearns made his professional debut with the Toledo Storm during the 2005–06 ECHL season. He spent the entire 2006–07 season in the American Hockey League (AHL) with Milwaukee Admirals. During the 2007–08 season, he played 53 games in the AHL with the Norfolk Admirals and also played 17 games in the ECHL with the Reading Royals. He played AHL hockey for the next two years with Norfolk and the Rockford IceHogs.

On July 27, 2010, Kearns was signed as a free agent by the Phoenix Coyotes who assigned him to their AHL affiliate in San Antonio for the start of the 2010–11 AHL season.

On July 14, 2011, Kearns signed a one-year, two-way contract with the Florida Panthers. During the 2011–12 season on October 20, 2011, at the age of 30, Kearns made his NHL debut with the Panthers playing seven shifts for 6:30 of ice time in a 3–0 loss to the Buffalo Sabres. Kearns was the second oldest player to make his NHL debut with the Panthers, behind only Magnus Svensson who made his NHL debut with Florida in 1995 at the age of 32. Kearns went scoreless in 5 games with the Panthers, before returning to the Rampage to be among the offensive leaders with 52 points in 69 games.

On July 2, 2012, Kearns was again on the move, signing a one-year free agent contract with the San Jose Sharks. With the 2012 NHL lockout in effect, Kearns reported directly to AHL affiliate, the Worcester Sharks, to begin the 2012–13 season.

Kearns was recalled from Worcester on December 28, 2013. The next day, Kearns scored his first NHL goal in the San Jose Sharks 3-1 victory over the Anaheim Ducks against goaltender Frederik Andersen. He became the oldest player in Sharks history to score his first NHL goal (32 years, 231 days), besting the previous record holder Jay Leach (30 years, 190 days). On February 24, 2014, Kearns was sent to waivers by the Sharks.

As a free agent from the Sharks, Kearns accepted a try-out contract to the Boston Bruins training camp for the 2014–15 season. Following camp, Kearns was released by the Bruins and after spending his entire professional career in North America, he opted to pursue a European career in agreeing to a one-year contract in the Finnish Liiga with the Espoo Blues on October 23, 2014.

After a successful season with the Blues, Kearns returned to North America on July 2, 2015, signing a one-year, two-way contract with the New York Islanders. On June 1, 2016, Kearns signed a new one-year, two-way contract with the Islanders.

Kearns played two seasons within the Islanders before leaving as a free agent to sign a one-year, two-way contract with the New Jersey Devils on July 1, 2017. In the 2017–18 season, Kearns was assigned to AHL affiliate, the Binghamton Devils for their inaugural season. Among the club's scoring leaders he registered 43 points in 67 games.

As a free agent, Kearns left North America in the off-season, agreeing to a one-year pact with Austrian outfit, EHC Black Wings Linz of the EBEL, on July 23, 2018. 

On August 25, 2019, Kearns announced his retirement from professional hockey.

Family
Kearns' father is Dennis Kearns, a retired All-Star defenceman for the Vancouver Canucks.

Career statistics

References

External links
 

1981 births
Living people
Binghamton Devils players
Bridgeport Sound Tigers players
Calgary Dinos ice hockey players
Cleveland Barons (2001–2006) players
EHC Black Wings Linz players
Espoo Blues players
Florida Panthers players
Milwaukee Admirals players
New York Islanders players
Norfolk Admirals players
Reading Royals players
Rockford IceHogs (AHL) players
San Antonio Rampage players
San Jose Sharks players
Ice hockey people from Vancouver
Toledo Storm players
Undrafted National Hockey League players
Worcester Sharks players
Canadian ice hockey centres